Yrttiaho is a Finnish surname. Notable people with the surname include:

Johannes Yrttiaho (born 1980), Finnish politician
Jyrki Yrttiaho (1952–2021), Finnish politician

Finnish-language surnames